Ana María Fernandini Clotet de Naranjo (April 17, 1902 – September 20, 1982) was a Peruvian heiress and politician in the early 1960s. She was the mayor of Lima from 1963 to 1964, the first of two women to hold that position, the other being Susana Villarán.

Fernandini was born in Lima to an upper-class family of Corsican descent.

Her manor in San Isidro was sold to the Soviet government in 1970, becoming the Soviet (later Russian) Embassy.

Mayors of Lima
Women mayors of places in Peru
Peruvian people of Italian descent
1902 births
1982 deaths
20th-century Peruvian women politicians
20th-century Peruvian politicians